This was ninth European Championship and was won for the second time by France.

Results

Final standings

References

European Nations Cup
European rugby league championship
European rugby league championship
International rugby league competitions hosted by the United Kingdom
International rugby league competitions hosted by France
1949 in English rugby league
1948 in French sport
1949 in French sport
1948 in Welsh sport
1949 in Welsh sport